Clinical Senates are non-statutory bodies of the English NHS, established by the Health and Social Care Act 2012.

Description
Clinical senates were established by the English NHSas multi-professional clinical leadership groups from April 2013 onward to "help clinical commissioning groups (CCGs), health and wellbeing boards (HWBs) and the NHS NHS Commissioning Board to make the best decisions about healthcare for the populations they represent by providing advice and leadership at a strategic level".

There are 12 Clinical Senates across England based upon geographical areas of major patient flows into tertiary centres, as determined by the NHS Commissioning Board: East of England, East Midlands, Greater Manchester and Eastern Cheshire, London, North West Coast, Northern, South East, South West, Thames Valley, Wessex, West Midlands, Yorkshire and the Humber.

As of March 2014, it had been reported that by the end of 2013 two had not met at all, three had met only once, and three met twice. Two clinical senates had met three times by the end of 2013. 
Sir David Nicholson, Chief Executive of NHS England in his retirement interview April 2014 was most critical of clinical senates, which he rated just four out of 10, saying he didn't "quite see the benefits coming through at the moment".

References

External links
 Clinical Senates

National Health Service (England)